Alive is the fourth Japanese studio album (sixth overall) by South Korean boy band Big Bang. It was released on March 28, 2012 including 10 songs: 4 Japanese versions, 2 new songs and 4 songs already released in Korean from the EP of same name. The album is the first release of the group under the label YGEX, a partnership between the Korean agency YG Entertainment with the Japanese label Avex Trax. The album was re-released on June 20 under the name "Alive -Monster Edition-". It included 9 songs of the Alive original album, 1 Japanese version and 2 songs released in Korean.

Release 
The album was released in five different editions: 2 CD+2DVD+Photobook (Type E comes with Goods and an exclusive video on DVD Disc 2. This version is only available at HMV Japan.), 2 CD+DVD (Type B comes with the DVD Disc 2 and Type C with the DVD Disc 3) and a Regular edition.

Monster edition 
A re-released edition, titled "Alive -Monster Edition-", was released in 3 versions: CD+DVD+T-shirt, CD+DVD and CD only.

Composition 
All songs from the album were written and produced by G-Dragon. On the Korean songs, additional rap lyrics were written by T.O.P. The song "Wings" was written and sung by Daesung.

The album includes 2 original Japanese songs, such as "Ego" and "Feeling"; Japanese versions of the songs "Blue", "Fantastic Baby", "Bad Boy" and "Haru Haru", previously released in Korean and 4 originally Korean songs, "Intro (Alive)", "Love Dust", "Ain't No Fun" and "Wings", Daesung's solo song. The Japanese version of the song "Haru Haru" was previously released on the greatest hits album The Best of Big Bang.

"Feeling" is produced and arranged by the German EDM and electro house producer and DJ Alexander Ridha A.K.A Boys Noize.

Promotions 
Since the album does not have singles, all music videos from the album ("Fantastic Baby", "Blue" and "Bad Boy") were released through music TV channels, such as MTV Japan, Space Shower TV and M-ON! (Music On! TV).

Live performances 
The group performed the Japanese version of the song "Fantastic Baby" on NTV's show Happy Music on March 30, on NHK's show Music Japan and on NTV's show Music Lovers on April 1.

Track listings

Charts

Album

Alive

Alive Monster Edition

Sales

Certifications

Accolades

Release history

References

External links
Big Bang Official Site
Big Bang Japanese Official Site

BigBang (South Korean band) albums
2012 albums
YG Entertainment albums
Avex Group albums
Japanese-language albums
Albums produced by G-Dragon
Albums produced by Teddy Park